Clase aparte is a 1980 studio album by Colombian group Binomio de Oro. The album contains the hits "Dime pajarito", "Voz de acordeones" - dedicated like the album to the murdered writer Octavio Daza, and "Habíamos terminado".

Track listing
 Dime, pajarito (husband and wife María Cristina de Daza and Octavio Daza)
 Pa mi amigo el querendón (Lácides Redondo)
 Habíamos terminado (Roberto Calderón)
 Qué te pasa, María Tere (:es:Julio Oñate Martínez)
 Recuerdos (:es:Hernando Marín)
 El que espabila pierde (Lenín Bueno Suárez)
 Quise manchar tu alma (Fernando Meneses Romero)
 La colegiala (Rubén Darío Salcedo/Julio De la Ossa)
 Canción para una amiga (Rosendo Romero)
 Voz de acordeones (:es:Tomás Darío Gutiérrez).
 Canción para una amiga (Rosendo Romero)

References

1980 albums